Julie...At Home is an LP album by Julie London, released by Liberty Records under catalog number LRP-3152 as a monophonic recording in 1960, and later in stereo under catalog number LST-7152 the same year.

Track listing

Personnel
 Julie London - vocals
 Bob Flanigan - trombone (tracks 4 & 10)
 Jimmy Rowles - piano
 Emil Richards - vibraphone (at the conclusion of "You Stepped Out of a Dream," Richards plays a long quote from "Well, You Needn't" by Thelonious Monk)
 Al Viola - guitar
 Don Bagley - bass
 Earl Palmer - drums

Recorded in Julie London's living room.

References

1960 albums
Julie London albums
Liberty Records albums